The Tărtărău is a left tributary of the river Sebeș in Romania. It flows into the Sebeș upstream from the Oașa Dam.

References

Rivers of Romania
Rivers of Alba County